As of September 2016, the International Union for Conservation of Nature (IUCN) lists 196 critically endangered reptile species, including 17 which are tagged as possibly extinct. 3.8% of all evaluated reptile species are listed as critically endangered. 
The IUCN also lists 12 reptile subspecies as critically endangered.

Of the subpopulations of reptiles evaluated by the IUCN, ten species subpopulations have been assessed as critically endangered.

Additionally 910 reptile species (18% of those evaluated) are listed as data deficient, meaning there is not sufficient information for a full assessment of conservation status. As these species typically have small distributions and/or populations, they are intrinsically likely to be threatened, according to the IUCN. While the category of data deficient indicates that no assessment of extinction risk has been made for the taxa, the IUCN notes that it may be appropriate to give them "the same degree of attention as threatened taxa, at least until their status can be assessed."

This is a complete list of critically endangered reptile species and subspecies evaluated by the IUCN. Species considered possibly extinct by the IUCN are marked as such. Species and subspecies which have critically endangered subpopulations (or stocks) are indicated.

Turtles and tortoises
There are 40 species, four subspecies, and three subpopulations of turtle assessed as critically endangered.

Cheloniids

Species
Hawksbill sea turtle (Eretmochelys imbricata)
Atlantic ridley sea turtle (Lepidochelys kempii)
Subpopulations
Loggerhead sea turtle (Caretta caretta) (3 subpopulations)

Tortoises

Species

Subspecies
Testudo graeca nikolskii

Geoemydids

Trionychids

Species

Subspecies
Black spiny softshell turtle (Apalone spinifera atra)
Subpopulations
African softshell turtle (Trionyx triunguis) (1 subpopulation)

Other turtles

Species

Subspecies
Seychelles yellow-bellied mud turtle (Pelusios castanoides intergularis)
Seychelles black mud turtle (Pelusios subniger parietalis)
Subpopulations
Leatherback sea turtle (Dermochelys coriacea) (4 subpopulations)

Crocodilia species

Lizards
There are 110 species, four subspecies, and one subpopulation of lizard assessed as critically endangered.

Iguanids

Species

Subspecies

Subpopulations
Black-chested spiny-tailed iguana (Ctenosaura melanosterna) (2 subpopulations)

Anguids

Chameleons

Gekkonids

Wall lizards

Skinks

Other lizard species

Snakes

Species

Subspecies

See also 
 Lists of IUCN Red List critically endangered species
 List of least concern reptiles
 List of near threatened reptiles
 List of vulnerable reptiles
 List of endangered reptiles
 List of recently extinct reptiles
 List of data deficient reptiles

References 

Reptiles
Critically endangered reptiles
Critically endangered reptiles
Reptile conservation